The genus Aztekium contains three species of small globular cactus. Discovered in 1929 by F. Ritter, in Rayones, Nuevo León, Mexico, this genus was thought to be monotypic (with Aztekium ritteri) until a second species (Aztekium hintonii) was discovered by George S. Hinton, in Galeana, Nuevo León in 1991. A further possible species, Aztekium valdezii, was described in 2011, but is considered to be a synonym of A. ritteri.

Description
Aztekium ritteri is a small plant (around 20 mm wide), with 9 to 11 ribs, which typically have transverse wrinkles. Its color varies from pale green to grayish-green. The center of the cactus contains a lot of white wool. Flowers are small (less than 10 mm wide), with white petals and pinkish sepals. The plants bear small pinkish berry-like fruits. A. hintonii is larger, to 10 cm in diameter, 10 to 18 grooved ribs, flowers magenta to 3 cm. It grows only on gypsum.

Species

Etymology
Its name is dedicated to the Aztec people, due to the resemblance between the plant's shape and certain Aztec sculptures.

Distribution
This genus is found only in the state of Nuevo León in Mexico. It was estimated that there were in the order of tens of millions of plants of A. hintonii, and at present most of its range is pristine. Though A. ritteri has been collected for decades and there has been destruction of its habitat, the number of plants in habitat is several million.

Cultivation
These species grow extremely slowly, taking around two years to attain a diameter of 3 mm. They are usually propagated by seeds.

Phytochemistry
The plants contain the following compounds:
N-methyltyramine
hordenine
anhalidine
mescaline
N,N-3,4-dimethoxy-phenethylamine
pellotine
3-methoxytyramine

References

External links

 Sacred and Medicinal Cacti by MS Smith
 Cactus File

Cacti of Mexico
Endemic flora of Mexico
Flora of Nuevo León
Medicinal plants of North America
Cactoideae genera
Cactoideae